The Partnership for Academic Competition Excellence (PACE) is a United States based 501(c)(3) non-profit organization that promotes high school quiz bowl and runs the National Scholastic Championship (NSC), an end-of-year national tournament for high school quiz bowl teams. PACE was founded in 1996 by a group of quiz bowl players and coaches who were dissatisfied with the quality of high school quiz bowl at the time. The NSC has been run in the June of every year since 1998. Beyond running the NSC, PACE offers advice and staff assistance to high schools and colleges who run high school quiz bowl tournaments. PACE does not currently supply questions for regular season tournaments or offer a collegiate competition program, unlike NAQT or Questions Unlimited.

In addition to running a national tournament, PACE awards the Benjamin Cooper Academic Ambassador Award each year at the opening ceremony of the NSC. The award is chosen by PACE members to honor "a high school academic competition team member, advisor, or organization whose character best promotes the spirit and honor of quiz bowl competition". It is named for Ben Cooper, who, as the captain of the It's Academic quiz bowl team at Georgetown Day School, worked with the PACE founders to provide a player's perspective on the plans for the inaugural NSC. Ben Cooper died in an automobile accident just before the start of his senior year. In 2004, PACE expanded its recognition program to include a "Young Ambassador" Award to recognize individuals or recent alumni from high school or college quiz bowl programs for "valuable and significant contributions to the high school academic competition community".

National Scholastic Championship
PACE runs the National Scholastic Championship, a tournament for high school quiz bowl teams. Teams that attend the PACE NSC are mainly from schools in the United States, with teams from Canada and Singapore having also attended. Teams qualify by placing well at a PACE-certified tournament. There are three levels of qualifier events, with higher levels allowing more teams to qualify from that event. A number of teams can also qualify via a wild card bid. There is no limit to the number of teams from a single school that can qualify or attend. In order to qualify multiple teams from one school, multiple teams must concurrently qualify at the same tournament.

On March 18, 2020, PACE announced that the 2020 NSC would be cancelled due to the 2019-20 coronavirus pandemic.

Format

The tournament takes place over two days during the weekend. On Saturday, teams are grouped into pools for preliminary rounds and play a round robin within that group, then are regrouped for playoff rounds based on their win–loss record in their preliminary group. On Sunday, teams are again regrouped into "superplayoff" brackets. Usually, a final will be played between the top two teams, though specific circumstances can make a final match unnecessary. Following the final rounds, an All-Star game featuring the top individual scorers is played and the closing ceremony is held.

Each round consists of two halves of ten tossups and ten bonuses. Tossups are worth 10 points for a correct answer, though 20 points may be awarded if they are answered early. Teams are not penalized for incorrect answers. Bouncebacks are allowed for bonuses. In the event of a tie, a sudden death tossup is read.

From 1998 to 2009, the NSC used a slightly different gameplay format that was distinct from most other quiz bowl tournaments. The old format had three rounds with varying gameplay, the Related Tossup-Bonus round, the Category Quiz round, and the Stretch round.

NSC results and Cooper award recipients

Notes

Other ventures
In March 2009, PACE organized the second annual "The Weekend of Quizbowl", a regular season invitational tournament at George Mason University that drew teams from across the United States. Part of the tournament ran on a custom question packets set that was also sold to other invitational tournaments. PACE did not run the tournament the following year. In 2014, PACE created an outreach fund to give monetary grants of up to 200 to high school quiz bowl teams.

See also 
 NAQT

References

External links 
 

Student quiz competitions
1998 establishments in the United States
Organizations established in 1998
Educational organizations based in the United States
501(c)(3) organizations